2-Butoxyethanol acetate is a chemical commonly used as a solvent; it is the acetate of 2-butoxyethanol.

Applications
2-Butoxyethanol acetate is used in a variety of industries as a solvent for nitrocellulose and multicolored lacquers, varnishes, enamels, and epoxy resin. It is useful as a solvent because of its high boiling point. It is also used in the manufacture of polyvinyl acetate latex. It is an ingredient in ink removers and spot removers.

Safety
It will react strongly with oxidizers. Its safety profile is similar to 2-butoxyethanol.

People can be exposed to 2-butoxyethanol acetate in the workplace by breathing it in, swallowing it, skin absorption, or eye contact. Symptoms of exposure include irritation of the eyes, skin, nose, and throat, hemolysis (bursting of red blood cells), hematuria (blood in the urine), central nervous system depression, headache, and vomiting. Chronic exposure can cause kidney damage, liver damage, and blood disease. People who work in printing, silk-screening, automobile repair, spray-painting, and furniture production may be exposed to 2-butoxyethanol acetate in the workplace.

People who do not work with 2-butoxyethanol acetate can be exposed to it in small amounts by touching or breathing in fumes from household cleaners.

References

Acetate esters
Ester solvents
Glycol esters